Unexpected is the debut studio album by German recording artist Levina. It was released on 28 April 2017 by Unser Song Records in association with RCA Records and Sony Music.

Singles
"Perfect Life" was released as the lead single from the album on 10 February 2017. The song peaked at number 28 on the German Singles Chart. In January 2017, Levina was confirmed to be one of the five finalists competing in Unser Song 2017, Germany's national final for the Eurovision Song Contest 2017. On 9 February 2017, the night of the final, she advanced to the final round with the songs "Wildfire" and "Perfect Life". The German public then chose "Perfect Life" as the winning song. As Germany is a member of the "Big Five", she will automatically advance to the final, held on 13 May 2017 in Kyiv, Ukraine.

Track listing

Release history

References

External links
 

2017 debut albums